Aftermath! ("Sunset on humanity, or dawn of a brave new world?") is a role-playing game created by Paul Hume and Robert Charette and published in 1981 by Fantasy Games Unlimited.

It is set in a post-apocalyptic world in which the characters fight for food, water, basic supplies, and shelter. 

The nature of the apocalypse is up to the game master. An expansion, Aftermath! Magic!, is set in a universe dominated by dragons in the style of the film Reign of Fire.

Game design
Aftermath! is the second RPG produced by Hume and Charrette for FGU after producing Bushido.  It was also praised for its features, but often criticized for its complexity, a common refrain when discussing games from FGU.

Aftermath! 101 (Courtesy David Harmer, Fantasy Games Unlimited) 

Characters are rated on a set of six stats – Wit, Will, Strength, Deftness, Speed, and Health. These are rated as follows:

 1-5 below average
 6-10 average
 11-14 above average
 15-24 Superior
 25-34 Above Superior
 35-40 Heroic

Characters also have a set of talents – Charismatic, Combative, Communicative, Esthetic, Mechanical, Natural, and Scientific. These talents govern the progress in skills, and can be used in a pinch as a “Natural Talent” instead of a skill.

Aftermath! is a true skill-based system, with no “levels” to artificially balance gameplay. A character has a set of skills that define the tasks that they are proficient in. Skills are rated on a skillscore, which is converted to a D20 roll (BCS) for convenience. If the D20 is under the BCS, then the skill test succeeds.

The combat system is a tiered system. The players only resolve the combat to the level of detail needed for the encounter; therefore, they can forgo using the more complex resolution methods if it benefits the game's current pace.

A basic attack is roll to hit (D20). If the target is an “extra”, there is no need to even roll for damage.
An average attack (for a player attacking) is roll to hit (D20), and then roll for damage.
A detailed attack is roll to hit (D20), roll for hit location (D100), then roll for damage.
A personality attack (or an attack against the PC) is roll to hit (D20) roll for location(d100) roll for damage, and resolve any special effects as needed.

Each weapon or attack method uses a different number of "damage dice" to express its power. A muscle-powered or melee weapon, for instance, uses the character's strength statistic as its damage dice.  Firearms, on the other hand, use a fixed amount of damage dice regardless of a character's stats, based on the caliber of the weapon.

Notable to this system, skill advancement (what might be considered "leveling-up" in other RPGs) is a fluid and ongoing process, based on the application of a talent during gameplay.  A specific talent that is used successfully during gameplay increments in ability immediately after being used.

Most everything the player needs to know to play the game is summarized on their character sheet.

Contents
 3 rulebooks - Basic Rules, Player's Guide and Gamemaster's Guide
 an introductory scenario
 character sheet
 a 3 panel reference sheet (full of tables and charts)
 counters and a feedback sheet

Reception
William A. Barton reviewed Aftermath in The Space Gamer No. 43. Barton commented that "If your taste in RPGs tends toward simplicity or to systems that are easily playable without a lot of work, you'll surely want to pass up Aftermath, and stick to Gamma World or The Morrow Project.  If you thrive on complexity, countless calculations and mounds of information, Aftermath will give you that - and more."

Like its sibling, Bushido, Aftermath! gained a number of very positive reviews on its publication. In the Open Box feature of White Dwarf #34, Andy Slack gave the game a 10/10, comparing it favourably to both Bushido and The Morrow Project RPG.

It received similar positive treatment in the pages of the short-lived Imagine magazine. The reviewer compared it favorably to Mad Max but disliked the use of Australia on purely familiarity reasons and suggested moving it to a location more familiar to the players. Baylis also compares the game to The Morrow Project and gives the adventure included a positive review.

Aftermath was ranked 29th in the 1996 reader poll of Arcane magazine to determine the 50 most popular roleplaying games of all time.  The UK magazine's editor Paul Pettengale commented: "Aftermath can be a harrowing game. Still, in the hands of a decent ref, it can also be one of the most involving to come out of the pre-1985 boom, with plenty of scope for freeform campaigns."

Reviews
Different Worlds #15 (Oct., 1981)
Arcane #14 (Christmas 1996)

Scenarios
A number of add-on scenario and campaign books were published. Because of the detailed rules, it was possible to build extremely detailed and believable worlds around actual places, such as Sydney University, where for example every room in the University was modeled with lengthy descriptions of items in each room, and maps based on actual university blueprints.

Aftermath Scenario Pack 1: Into The Ruins - The City of Littleton (1981), by Robert N. Charrette and Paul R. Hume. Published by Fantasy Games Unlimited. Takes place in the city of Littleton, Illinois.
Aftermath Scenario Pack A1: Operation Morpheus - The Ruins of the University (1982), by Phil McGregor. Published by Fantasy Games Unlimited. Takes place in Australia centered on Sydney University
Aftermath Campaign Pack A2 - Sydney, The Wilderness (1984), by Phil McGregor. Published by Fantasy Games Unlimited. Sydney region.
Adventure Pack K1 - The Empire of Karo (1984), by William Pixley. Published by Fantasy Games Unlimited. Set in Cairo, Illinois.
Aftermath Campaign Pack C1 - The City State, Chicago & The Illinois River Valley (1987), by J. Andrew Keith. Published by Fantasy Games Unlimited.
Aftermath! Technology (1992), by David S. Harmer. Published by Dinosaur Games. Rules expansion and technology supplement.
Aftermath! Technology (2008), by David S. Harmer. 2nd edition Published by Fantasy Games Unlimited. Rules expansion and technology supplement.
Aftermath! Survival Guide (2008), by David S. Harmer. Published by Fantasy Games Unlimited. Rules expansion and technology supplement covering roleplaying during the collapse.
Aftermath! - The Lost Adventures (2009), is a reprint of Aftermath Scenario Pack A1: Operation Morpheus - The Ruins of the University and Adventure Pack K1 - The Empire of Karo in a single volume.
Aftermath! Magic! (2010), by David S. Harmer. 2nd edition Published by Fantasy Games Unlimited. Magic rules expansion and campaign supplement. Covers playing after a Magical collapse.
Aftermath! Asteroid Cybele: The American Wasteland, By David S. Harmer and Eddie Johnson - Campaign pack set 20 years after an asteroid hits the planet. Covers the United States. This is the largest campaign pack ever published by FGU for Aftermath! The first campaign book in the connected Cybele campaign.
Aftermath: Asteroid Cybele: Lords of London, by Stephen Dedman. The London area after the collapse.
Aftermath! Asteroid Cybele: The Wild West, by Stephen Dedman. Southwest Australia in the Cybele campaign.
Aftermath! Asteroid Cybele: The Fleet, by David S. Harmer. The surviving US fleet, traveling the world, and finding a "Lost Island" of adventures and bio-engineering. This campaign pack ties the other Cybele campaigns together.
Aftermath! Asteroid Cybele: Prague, by David S. Harmer. Announced European campaign pack for the Cybele campaign. Release postponed to 2021.

References

External links
Aftermath! credits
Game contents and expansion packs
 French language fansite Loukoum Online
Fantasy Games Unlimited Website

 
Fantasy Games Unlimited games
Post-apocalyptic role-playing games
Role-playing games introduced in 1981